A total lunar eclipse took place on December 8, 1946. A shallow total eclipse saw the Moon in relative darkness for 57 minutes and 18 seconds. The Moon was 16.39% of its diameter into the Earth's umbral shadow, and should have been significantly darkened. The partial eclipse lasted for 3 hours 14 minutes and 54 seconds in total.

Visibility

Related lunar eclipses

Lunar year series

Saros series 
It was part of Saros series 134.

Tritos series 
 Preceded: Lunar eclipse of January 8, 1936
 Followed: Lunar eclipse of November 7, 1957

Tzolkinex 
 Preceded: Lunar eclipse of October 28, 1939
 Followed: Lunar eclipse of February 10, 1952

See also
List of lunar eclipses
List of 20th-century lunar eclipses

Notes

External links

1946-12
1946 in science